The Sumter County Courthouse is a historic county courthouse building in Livingston, Sumter County, Alabama.

Description
Designed in the Beaux-Arts style, it has served as the Sumter County Courthouse since its completion in 1902.  The two-story structure is built of red brick, with terracotta architectural elements, over a stone clad foundation.  It is topped by a dome and cupola. It was designed by Chapman and Frederick Ausfeld.

The Sumter County Courthouse is centered in a large town square, that is enclosed within an iron fence.  An adjacent bored well pavilion, built in brick in 1924; and an 1830s brick probate office; also occupy the square.

It was added to the National Register of Historic Places on March 24, 1972.

See also
National Register of Historic Places listings in Sumter County, Alabama
Courthouses on the National Register of Historic Places in Alabama

References

County courthouses in Alabama
Buildings and structures in Sumter County, Alabama
Government buildings completed in 1902
Courthouses on the National Register of Historic Places in Alabama
National Register of Historic Places in Sumter County, Alabama
Beaux-Arts architecture in Alabama